Kinnaird Rowe McKee (August 14, 1929 – December 30, 2013) was an American United States Navy four star admiral who served as Director, Naval Nuclear Propulsion from 1982 to 1988. He also served as Superintendent, United States Naval Academy from 1975 to 1978.

McKee was born in Louisville, Kentucky on August 14, 1929, and graduated from the United States Naval Academy in 1951. He served in the Pacific fleet destroyer USS Marshall (DD-676) during the Korean War and in eight submarines of the Atlantic fleet since that time. After completion of submarine training in 1953, he served in three diesel-powered submarines: USS Picuda (SS-382), USS Sea Cat (SS-399), and USS Marlin (SST-2). In 1956, Admiral McKee was ordered to command of USS X-1, a small experimental submarine. He graduated from nuclear power training in 1958 and joined the commissioning crew of USS Skipjack (SSN-585), the Navy's first high performance nuclear-powered attack submarine. Assignment as Executive Officer of USS Nautilus (SSN-571) followed in 1961, then of the USS Sam Houston (SSBN-609) in late 1962. After three deterrent patrols on the SAM HOUSTON, he served in the Naval Reactors Division of the Atomic Energy Commission from 1964 to 1966. Admiral McKee served as Commanding Officer of the nuclear-powered attack submarine USS Dace (SSN-607) from 1966 through 1969. The ship was twice awarded the Navy Unit Commendation and three times the Battle Efficiency Pennant for operations during that period.

Following command of Dace, Admiral McKee served in the office of the Director, Navy Program Planning, where his responsibilities included strategic warfare, research and development, and submarine and anti-submarine warfare systems. In 1970, he was assigned to the immediate staff of the Chief of Naval Operations, where he established the CNO Executive Panel. As Commander, Submarine Group Eight, Admiral McKee served as the NATO and U.S. submarine commander in the Mediterranean from 1973 to 1975. On August 1, 1975, he became the forty-eighth Superintendent of the U.S. Naval Academy. Promoted to three-star rank in March 1978, Admiral McKee served as Commander, Third Fleet with headquarters in Pearl Harbor. From there he was assigned as Director, Naval Warfare, Office of the Chief of Naval Operations concurrent with the expansion of the directorate from its original concentration on anti-submarine warfare to responsibility for all aspects of naval warfare. He developed and implemented the new organization.

On February 1, 1982, he relieved Admiral Hyman G. Rickover as the Director, Naval Nuclear Propulsion. On March 2, 1982, he was confirmed by the U.S. Senate for promotion to four-star rank. Admiral McKee retired on October 31, 1988, after 41 years of service to his country. Admiral McKee's decorations include the Distinguished Service Medal, five awards of the Legion of Merit, and three awards of the Navy Unit Commendation.

He died after a long illness on December 30, 2013.

References

External links

Biography

1929 births
2013 deaths
United States Navy admirals
United States Naval Academy alumni
United States submarine commanders
Military personnel from Louisville, Kentucky
Recipients of the Navy Distinguished Service Medal
Recipients of the Legion of Merit
Superintendents of the United States Naval Academy